Deadly Web is a 2005 detective novel by English crime writer Barbara Nadel. Set in Turkey, it is one of a series that features Istanbul police inspector Çetin İkmen. It was the last novel to win the CWA Silver Dagger in 2005, as the award was abolished in 2006.

References

2005 novels
British crime novels
Novels set in Turkey